Simon Waley Waley (23 August 1827, Stockwell, London30 December 1875, Marylebone, London) was one of the leading members of Anglo-Jewry in the 19th century.

He was a leading broker on the London Stock Exchange and a prominent amateur musician.  He was a leading figure in the Jewish community during the period of the emancipation of the Jews from civil disabilities.

He contributed many letters to The Times under the signature W. London.  His letters on A tour in Auvergne, published in the Daily News in 1858, were incorporated into John Murray's Handbook for Travellers in France.

Waley was a highly gifted musician.  He began to compose as a child.  His first published work, L'arpeggio (for piano), was published in 1848. He had piano lessons from Ignaz Moscheles, William Sterndale Bennett and George Alexander Osborne, and lessons in theory and composition from William Horsley and Bernhard Molique.  As well as being a brilliant pianist (he performed regularly at concerts of the Amateur Musical Society conducted by Henry Leslie), Waley was a prolific composer. His published compositions include a piano concerto (op. 16), two piano trios (in B flat and G minor, op. 15 and op. 20), marches and caprices for piano, and many songs, including "Angels' voices" and "Sing on, sing on, ye little birds".  He also wrote orchestral pieces, which were not published.  One of his finest works is a setting of Psalms 117 and 118 for the synagogue service.

He died at home in 1875 and is buried at Balls Pond Road Cemetery.

Family 
He was the son of Solomon Waley and the younger brother of Jacob Waley.  Among other members of the same family were Arthur Waley, Sir Robert Waley Cohen and Sir Bernard Waley-Cohen.

References

Sources
. 
 Grove Dictionary of Music and Musicians

1827 births
1875 deaths
English Jews
English classical pianists
Male classical pianists
Jewish classical musicians
People from Stockwell
19th-century classical pianists
19th-century English musicians
Burials at Balls Pond Road Cemetery
19th-century British male musicians